Vamos a la playa (Spanish for "Let's go to the beach") may refer to:

 "Vamos a la playa" (Righeira song), 1983
 "Vamos a la playa" (Miranda song), 1999